The High Commissioner of the United Kingdom to Papua New Guinea is the United Kingdom's foremost diplomatic representative in the Independent State of Papua New Guinea.

Papua New Guinea gained independence (from Australia) in 1975. The new state chose to be a member of the Commonwealth of Nations, so the UK's diplomatic representative is a High Commissioner rather than an ambassador.

List of heads of mission

High Commissioners

===

1975–1977: George Baker
1977–1982: Donald Middleton
1982–1986: Arthur Collins
1986–1989: Michael Howell
1989–1991: John Sharland
1991–1994: John Guy
1994–1997: Brian Low
1997–2000: Charles Drace-Francis
2000–2003: Simon Scaddan
2003–2007: David Gordon-Macleod
2007–2010: David Dunn
2010–2014: Jackie Barson
2014–2018: Simon Tonge

2018–: Keith Scott

References

External links
UK and Papua New Guinea, gov.uk

Papua New Guinea
 
United Kingdom
Papua New Guinea and the Commonwealth of Nations
United Kingdom and the Commonwealth of Nations